Willsie is a surname.  Notable people with the surname include:

 Brian Willsie (born 1978), Canadian ice hockey player
 David Willsie (born 1968), Canadian wheelchair rugby player and coach
 Harry Willsie (1928–2003), Canadian sport shooter

See also
 Willkie